Taman may refer to:

Places 
Taman Peninsula, a peninsula in southern Russia
Taman Bay,  an inlet of the Strait of Kerch off the peninsula
Taman, Russia, a rural locality located on the peninsula
Port of Taman, a seaport on the Peninsula
Taman, Nepal, a village in Nepal
Taman, Togo, name of several places in Togo
Taman, Central Java, a district in Pemalang Regency, Central Java
Taman, Madiun, a district in Madiun Regency, East Java
Taman, Sidoarjo, a district in Sidoarjo Regency, East Java

Other uses 
Taman language (disambiguation), several languages with the name
Taman (also Thaman or Tuman), common Arabic name for the desert grass Panicum turgidum
Thaman, Indian music director
Taman Division, of the Moscow Military District of the Russian Ground Forces
USSR Taman, USSR recovery ship

See also
Tamam (disambiguation)